Unnao is a constituency of the Uttar Pradesh Legislative Assembly covering the city of Unnao in the Unnao district of Uttar Pradesh, India.

Unnao is one of six assembly constituencies in the Unnao Lok Sabha constituency. Since 2008, this assembly constituency is numbered 165 amongst 403 constituencies.

Members of Legislative Assembly

Election results

2022 
Bharatiya Janata Party candidate Pankaj Gupta won in 2022 Uttar Pradesh Legislative Elections defeating Samajwadi Party candidate Anubhav Kumar by a margin of 31,128 votes.

2017
Bharatiya Janata Party candidate Pankaj Gupta won in 2017 Uttar Pradesh Legislative Elections defeating Samajwadi Party candidate Manisha Deepak by a margin of 46,072 votes.

References

http://eciresults.nic.in/AC/ConstituencywiseS24165.htm?ac=165
http://www.elections.in/uttar-pradesh/assembly-constituencies/unnao.html

External links
 

Unnao
Assembly constituencies of Uttar Pradesh